Berdyash (Bärźäş) is a rural locality (a selo) in Baykinsky Selsoviet, Karaidelsky District, Bashkortostan, Russia. The population was 154 as of 2010. There are 15 streets.

Geography 
Berdyash is located 18 km southeast of Karaidel (the district's administrative centre) by road. Abyzovo is the nearest rural locality.

References 

Rural localities in Karaidelsky District